Blastobasis exclusa is a moth in the  family Blastobasidae. It is found on the Canary Islands.

The wingspan is 12–14 mm. The forewings are pale stony grey, sparsely sprinkled with fuscous and rust-brown scales. The hindwings are grey.

References

Moths described in 1908
Blastobasis